

X

X